Habrocnemis is a genus of grasshoppers in the subfamily Habrocneminae with species found in South-East Asia.

Species
The Orthoptera Species File lists:
Habrocnemis shanensis Uvarov, 1942 - Myanmar (type locality is in southern Shan state), Myanmar, also southern China and Vietnam.
Habrocnemis sinensis Uvarov, 1930 - type species - central China

References

External links
Image at Alamy: Habrocnemis shanensis

Acrididae
Orthoptera of Indo-China
Taxa named by Boris Uvarov